This is a List of personnel from the various lineups of Alice Cooper's studio and touring bands.

Origins 
Alice Cooper's original group, also called Alice Cooper, was formed in the 1960s and officially disbanded in 1975, although they had broken up in 1973 and tried to continue with replacement members. Alice Cooper went on to a successful solo career beginning in 1973, simply referred to as "Alice Cooper". Members of the original act formed "Billion Dollar Babies", which was named after the original band's hit song. For information about the original act, please use this link.

This list is about the members of the post-1973 era Alice Cooper solo act and not the original Alice Cooper Band.

Timeline

References

Alice Cooper (band) members
Cooper, Alice